David M. Sabatini (born January 27, 1968) is an American scientist and a former professor of biology at the Massachusetts Institute of Technology. From 2002 to 2021, he was a member of the Whitehead Institute for Biomedical Research. He was also an investigator of the Howard Hughes Medical Institute from 2008 to 2021 and was elected to the National Academy of Sciences in 2016. He is known for his contributions in the areas of cell signaling and cancer metabolism, most notably the co-discovery of mTOR.

In 2021 and 2022, Sabatini was fired from the Howard Hughes Medical Institute and resigned his positions at the Whitehead Institute and the Massachusetts Institute of Technology, following allegations of sexual harassment. Sabatini denies the allegations.

Biography 

David M. Sabatini was born and raised in New York to David D. Sabatini and Zulema Sabatini, both Argentine immigrants from Buenos Aires.  He obtained his B.S. from Brown University followed by both his MD and his Ph.D. at Johns Hopkins School of Medicine, where he worked in the lab of Solomon H. Snyder. He joined the Whitehead Institute as a Whitehead Fellow in 1997, the same year he matriculated from Johns Hopkins.  In 2002 he became an Assistant Professor at MIT and a Member of the Whitehead Institute. He was promoted to tenured professor in 2006.

Sabatini currently resides in Cambridge, Massachusetts and is an avid biker and gardener. His father, David D. Sabatini, is a cell biologist and Professor at New York University. His younger brother, Bernardo L. Sabatini, is a neuroscientist and Professor at Harvard Medical School.

Sabatini is the scientific founder of Navitor, Raze Therapeutics, and KSQ Therapeutics.

Allegations of sexual misconduct 
In late 2021, following an investigation by an outside law firm of concerns surrounding sexual harassment, the Howard Hughes Medical Institute fired Sabatini, and he resigned from the Whitehead Institute.  Following this, MIT placed Sabatini on administrative leave while it conducted its own investigation.  MIT's investigation concluded that Sabatini had violated its policies on sexual relationships in the workplace.  The investigation gave a recommendation to revoke tenure, at which time Sabatini resigned from his position at MIT.  Sabatini denies that the alleged behavior was sexual harassment, and he has filed a defamation lawsuit against the Whitehead Institute and two of its scientists.

In 2022, Sabatini was under consideration for a position at the NYU Grossman School of Medicine.  After significant protests from students and some faculty over the sexual harassment allegations, he withdrew his name from consideration.

Independent funding
In February 2023, Bill Ackman and an unnamed partner announced $25 million to fund Sabatini research, though it is unclear if he could successfully find an institution willing to host his lab or if one could be built independently.

Scientific contributions 

As a graduate student in Solomon Snyder's Lab at Johns Hopkins, Sabatini began working on understanding the molecular mechanism of rapamycin; a macrolide antibiotic discovered in the soil of Easter Island that has potent antifungal, immunosuppressive, and anti-tumorigenic properties.  Although the TOR/DRR genes had been identified in 1993 as conferring rapamycin resistance in budding yeast, the direct target of rapamycin and its mechanism of action in mammals was unknown. In 1994, Sabatini used rapamycin and its binding partner FKBP12 to purify the mechanistic Target of Rapamycin (mTOR) protein from rat brain, showing it to be the direct target of rapamycin in mammals and the homolog of the yeast TOR/DRR genes.

Since starting his own lab at the Whitehead Institute in 1997, Sabatini has made numerous key contributions to the understanding of mTOR function, regulation, and importance in diseases such as cancer. For example, his lab discovered the mTORC1 and mTORC2 multi-protein complexes, the nutrient sensing Rag GTPase pathway upstream of mTORC1, as well as the direct amino acid sensors Sestrin and CASTOR.
 

Sabatini's research interests have expanded in recent years to include cancer metabolism as well as technology development surrounding the use of high-throughput genetic screens in human cells, most notably through the use of RNA interference and the CRISPR-Cas9 system.

Selected awards and honors 
 2009 Paul Marks Prize for Cancer Research
 2014 NAS Award in Molecular Biology
 2017 Lurie Prize in Biomedical Sciences
 2019 Louisa Gross Horwitz Prize for contributions to cancer research
 2020 BBVA Foundation Frontiers of Knowledge Awards in Biology and Biomedicine
 2020 Nemmers Prize in Medical Science
 2020 Sjöberg Prize from the Royal Swedish Academy of Sciences

Selected publications

References

Further reading 
 Part 1, Part 2.  Retrieved February 12, 2023

External links

1968 births
Living people
American biochemists
Johns Hopkins School of Medicine alumni
Members of the United States National Academy of Sciences
Brown University alumni
American people of Argentine descent